Marianne Gaba (November 13, 1939 – May 3, 2016) was an American model, actress, and beauty queen. She was Miss Illinois USA 1957 and Playboy magazine's Playmate of the Month for its September 1959 issue.

Personal life
Gaba was born in Chicago, Illinois. She was fluent in three languages—Bohemian (Czech), Polish, and Spanish—in addition to English.

On June 11, 1960, she married Michael Eugene Starkman in Las Vegas, Nevada. Her son, Gregory C., was born in 1962 and her daughter, Wendy M. was born in 1966.

Gaba died on May 3, 2016, from brain cancer in Los Angeles, California, aged 76.

Filmography
 Dr. Goldfoot and the Bikini Machine (1965) .... Robot
 How to Stuff a Wild Bikini (1965) .... Animal
 The Beverly Hillbillies
 "Cool School Is Out" (1965) .... Squirrel
 "Big Daddy, Jed" (1965) .... Squirrel
 Burke's Law - "Who Killed the Fat Cat?" (1965) .... Beautiful Blonde
 The Patsy (1964) (uncredited) .... Waitress
 Island of Love (1963) (uncredited)
 The Choppers (1961) .... Liz
 Checkmate - "The Button-Down Break" (1961) .... Girl Friend
 77 Sunset Strip
 "The Affairs of Adam Gallante" (1960) .... Peaches Schultz
 "Sing Something Simple" (1959) .... Lita Ladoux
 G.I. Blues (1960) (uncredited) .... Bargirl
 Raymie (1960) .... Second Girl
 Please Don't Eat the Daisies (1960) (uncredited) .... Young Girl
 Mike Hammer (1959) .... Doris' daughter
 Johnny Staccato - "A Piece of Paradise" (1959) .... Gaba Gaba Hey
 Missile to the Moon (1958) .... Moon Girl
George Burns & Gracie Allen Show - “Too Much Pot Roast” (1957) ….. Miss Illinois

See also
 List of people in Playboy 1953–1959
 List of Playboy Playmates of 1959

References

External links
 

1939 births
2016 deaths
Actresses from Chicago
Miss USA 1950s delegates
1950s Playboy Playmates
Female models from Illinois
Deaths from brain cancer in the United States
21st-century American women